Robin Hood Hills are a steep sided range of sandstone hills forming a natural amphitheatre surrounding the villages of Annesley and Newstead in Nottinghamshire, England. Robin Hood's Cave lies at the bottom of the hills. They rise to a height of 195 metres above sea level at Coxmoor, Kirkby-in-Ashfield. A railway tunnel passes underneath the hills on the Robin Hood Line railway between Newstead railway station and Kirkby-in-Ashfield railway station.

Ashfield District
Landforms of Nottinghamshire
Mountains and hills of England